The World Racquetball Championships is the top international racquetball competition organized by the International Racquetball Federation (IRF).

History
The first event was held in 1981 as part of the 1981 World Games. The second World Championships were in 1984, and they have been a biannual event since then with the exception of the COVID-19 pandemic period, which delayed the 2020 event by one year. 

Worlds have been held in 13 countries across four continents: North and South America as well as Asia and Europe. The United States has hosted Worlds most often - 4 times, though not since 1996, followed by Mexico, 3 times, and twice each in Canada, the Dominican Republic, and South Korea. 

The 2022 World Championships were held in San Luis Potosi, Mexico, which was the first time Worlds was in Mexico since 2000, when it was also held in San Luis Potosi. The 2022 Worlds introduced Mixed Doubles for the first time, and re-introduced the Team Competition (best of three matches: two singles & one doubles), which was held at Worlds until 2012, after which the team winners were determined by the points earned in the individual competitions. 

Also, the 2022 World Championships used a best of five games match format with each game to 11 points, win by 2, with rally scoring, as used in other sports like squash and volleyball. Rally scoring - the winner of every rally scores a point - was introduced at Worlds in 2021. Previously, racquetball games used side-out scoring, where players scored points only when they had won a rally which began with that player serving. Rallies won when not serving were simply side-outs: the rally losing player lost the serve and the rally winning player won the opportunity to serve, but did not win a point.

Editions and team results

Winners

Multiple world champions

World champions by country

References

External links
World championships - IRF - Team Standings
World championships - IRF - Individual Standings

 
Racquetball competitions
Racquetball